Silverton High School or Silverton School is a public high school located in Silverton, Texas (USA) and classified as a 1A school by the UIL. It is part of the Silverton Independent School District located in western Briscoe County. In 2015, the school was rated "Met Standard" by the Texas Education Agency.

History
The present high school building was built in 1929 after the old building burned. In 1957, the present gymnasium and the original four rooms of the elementary building were constructed. In 1958, the Vocational Agriculture department was added to the west end of the gymnasium. Four elementary classrooms were added to the existing four in 1959. In 1964, the cafeteria was built. This building also includes the home economics department, along with other classrooms. The high school was extensively remodeled in 1970, and a new junior high wing was added to the south side of it. Partitions from the old junior high building were removed to create a football field house and weight room in 1977. A new shop was added to the existing agriculture facilities in 1978. The aging field house was razed in 1996, and a new P.E. gym and athletic field house was built. It was named O.C. Rampley Field House in honor of former Superintendent O.C. Rampley.

Athletics
The Silverton Owls compete in these sports 

Basketball
Cross Country
6-Man Football
Track and Field

References

External links
Silverton ISD website
List of Six-man football stadiums in Texas

 
Public high schools in Texas
Public middle schools in Texas
Public elementary schools in Texas